Futalosine hydrolase (futalosine nucleosidase, MqnB) is an enzyme with systematic name futalosine ribohydrolase. This enzyme catalyses the following chemical reaction

 futalosine + H2O  dehypoxanthine futalosine + hypoxanthine

This enzyme catalyses the second step of menaquinone biosynthesis.

References

External links 
 

EC 3.2.2